Aurimas is a masculine Lithuanian given name. Notable people with the name include:

Aurimas Adomavičius (born 1993), Lithuanian rower
Aurimas Didžbalis (born 1991), Lithuanian weightlifter 
Aurimas Kieža (born 1982), Lithuanian basketball player 
Aurimas Kučys (born 1981), Lithuanian footballer
Aurimas Lankas (born 1985), Lithuanian sprint canoeist
Aurimas Majauskas (born 1993), Lithuanian basketball player
Aurimas Taurantas (born 1956), Lithuanian politician
Aurimas Valaitis (born 1988), Lithuanian swimmer
Aurimas Vertelis (born 1986), Lithuanian footballer
Aurimas Vilkaitis (born 1993), Lithuanian footballer

Lithuanian masculine given names